Klavdy Vasiliyevich Lebedev (October 16 (28), 1852 – September 21 (N.S. October 4), 1916) was a Russian painter, a member of the realist artist group The Wanderers.

Biography
Lebedev came from a peasant family, studied at the Stroganov Moscow State Academy of Arts and Industry and the Moscow School of Painting, Sculpture and Architecture under Vasily Perov and Evgraf Sorokin. From 1890 he taught there.

In 1881 he was awarded a large silver medal of the Imperial Academy of Arts and received the title of a class artist. Member of The Wanderers group (1891).

The title of academician of painting of the Imperial Academy of Arts (1897). The title of full member of the Academy of Arts (1906).

Consisted full-time professor of the Academy of Arts (1894–1898).

Work

References

Literature
 

19th-century painters from the Russian Empire
Russian male painters
Peredvizhniki
20th-century Russian painters
1852 births
1916 deaths
Place of birth missing
19th-century male artists from the Russian Empire
20th-century Russian male artists
Moscow School of Painting, Sculpture and Architecture alumni
Stroganov Moscow State Academy of Arts and Industry alumni